A Signal-regulatory protein (SIRP) is one of a family of transmembrane glycoproteins involved in immunological signalling, expressed mainly by myeloid cells.

Members include :
 Signal-regulatory protein alpha, ligand=CD47
 SIRPB1
 SIRPD
 SIRPG, ligand=CD47

References 

Single-pass transmembrane proteins